Cătălin Petre Crăciunescu (born 16 September 1977) is a Romanian former footballer who played as a defender and midfielder.

Honours
Universitatea Craiova
Cupa României runner-up: 1997–98
Divizia B: 2005–06
Pandurii Târgu Jiu
Divizia B: 2004–05

References

1977 births
Living people
Romanian footballers
Romania under-21 international footballers
Association football defenders
Liga I players
Liga II players
CS Minerul Motru players
FC U Craiova 1948 players
FC Dinamo București players
FC Progresul București players
CS Pandurii Târgu Jiu players
AFC Rocar București players